A cage is a structure, typically an enclosure, made of mesh, bars or wires.

Cage or CAGE may also refer to:

Structures
 Cage (bearing), a component of a rolling-element bearing
 Cage, a separated enclosure in a computer colocation centre
 Batting cage (or tunnel), an enclosure for baseball or softball batting practice
 Faraday cage, or Faraday shield, an enclosure used to block electromagnetic fields
 Rib cage, a part of the skeleton

Places 
 Cage (Srebrenik), a village in Bosnia and Herzegovina
 Cage, Croatia, a village

People
 Cage (rapper) (born 1973), stage name of American rapper Chris Palko
 Brian Cage (born 1984), ring name of American professional wrestler Brian Button
 Buddy Cage (1946–2020), American pedal steel guitarist
 Byron Cage (born 1962), African-American gospel recording artist
 Christian Cage (born 1973), ring name of Canadian-American professional wrestler Jason Reso
 David Cage (born 1969), French video game designer
 Harry Cage (1795–1859), antebellum U.S. Congressman
 John Cage (1912–1992), American experimental composer
 Michael Cage (born 1962), American basketball player
 Nicolas Cage (born 1964), American actor
 Stuart Cage (born 1973), English golfer
 Wayne Cage (born 1951), American baseball player
 William Cage (disambiguation)

Arts, entertainment, and media

Fictional entities
 Cage, in the video game Twisted Metal: Black
 John Cage (character), in the television show Ally McBeal
 Johnny Cage, a fictional character from the Mortal Kombat video games
 Luke Cage, a fictional character portrayed in Marvel Comics
 Xander Cage, the protagonist in the film XXX
 Cage Midwell, the protagonist of the video game Zone of the Enders: The Fist of Mars
 Cages (comics)

Music
 Cage (band), an American heavy metal band
 Cage the Elephant, an American alternative rock band
 "Cage", a song by Dir En Grey from the album Gauze
 "Cage", a song by Manafest from the album The Moment
 "Cages", a song by Deas Vail from the album Birds and Cages

Other uses in arts, entertainment, and media
 Cage (film), a 1989 action film and its 1994 sequel Cage II
 "Cage" (Law & Order: Special Victims Unit), a television episode
 Cages (film), a 2005 film
 Cages and Other Stories, by Andrew Michael Hurley

Science and technology
 Cage (graph theory), a type of mathematical graph
 CAGE questionnaire, a screening tool for determining alcoholism
 Cap analysis gene expression, a molecular biology technique

Other uses
 CAGE (organisation), a London-based advocacy organization
 Commercial and Government Entity (CAGE) Code
 Iron cage, a sociological term

See also
 Caging (disambiguation)
 Gabion, a cage filled with coarse gravel or rock
 La Cage (disambiguation)
 La Cage aux Folles (disambiguation)
 The Cage (disambiguation)
 The Gilded Cage